Editura Minerva is one of the largest publishing houses in Romania. Located in Bucharest, it is known, among other things, for publishing classic Romanian literature, children's books, and scientific books.

The company was founded in Bucharest in 1898, but closed after World War II.  It re-opened in 1970. It was privatized in 1999 and was bought by Megapress Holdings in 2002.

See also
 Biblioteca pentru toți

References

External links
Official website
Current collections

Book publishing companies of Romania
Companies based in Bucharest
Publishing companies established in 1898
Mass media in Bucharest
1898 establishments in Romania
Re-established companies
Publishing companies disestablished in 1945
1945 disestablishments in Romania
Publishing companies established in 1970
1970 establishments in Romania